Spinnolio is a Canadian animated short film, directed by John Weldon and released in 1977. A parody of Pinocchio, the film tells the story of an old man who carves a wooden boy; however, as the fairy never arrives to grant him life, Spinnolio remains wooden and inanimate, but nevertheless successfully establishes a career working at the complaints desk of a department store because of his apparent skill at listening without talking.

The film's voice cast includes Henry Ramer, Peter MacNeill, Neil Shee, Janet Perlman, Lynn Smith and Don Arioli.

The film won the Canadian Film Award for Best Animated Short Film at the 28th Canadian Film Awards.

References

External links
 Spinnolio at the National Film Board of Canada
 

1977 short films
1977 films
Canadian animated short films
Best Animated Short Film Genie and Canadian Screen Award winners
National Film Board of Canada animated short films
Films directed by John Weldon
Pinocchio films
English-language Canadian films
1970s English-language films
1970s Canadian films